Yellowhead Mountain is located on the border of Alberta and British Columbia. It was named for Pierre Bostonais aka Tête Jaune. The mountain has four officially named summits: Bingley Peak, Leather Peak, Lucerne Peak, and Tête Roche.

Climate

Based on the Köppen climate classification, Yellowhead Mountain is located in a subarctic climate zone with cold, snowy winters, and mild summers.

See also
 List of peaks on the Alberta–British Columbia border
 List of mountains of Alberta
 Mountains of British Columbia

References

Yellowhead Mountain
Yellowhead Mountain
Canadian Rockies